Fann-Point E-Amitié is a commune d'arrondissement of the city of Dakar, Senegal. It is located on the southwestern coast of the Cap-Vert peninsula. As of 2013, it had a population of 18,841.

References

Arrondissements of Dakar